Billeberga is a locality situated in Svalöv Municipality, Skåne County, Sweden with 987 inhabitants in 2010.

References 

Populated places in Svalöv Municipality
Populated places in Skåne County